Gloria Evangelina Anzaldúa (1942–2004) was a prolific Chicana writer of prose, fiction, and poetry. After moving from her native Texas to California in 1977, she exclusively focused on her writing, publishing dozens of pieces of writing before her death. She left behind several manuscripts in progress when she died.

Among her most popular pieces of writing are This Bridge Called My Back: Writings by Radical Women of Color (1981) and Borderlands / La Frontera: The New Mestiza (1987; especially a section entitled "La conciencia de la mestiza/Towards a Mestiza Consciousness"). She wrote variously about feminism, the role of women of color in feminism, self-reflection, borderlands (particularly the space around the Mexico–United States border), Indigenous mythology and culture, and identity and contradiction. She developed the framework of mestiza consciousness, contributed to the field of queer theory, and valued intersectionality over single-identity movements. She is remembered as an especially influential writer in late nineteenth century cultural studies.

Books

Articles and essays

Fiction 

All of her children's books, and many of her short stories for children, feature Prieta/Prietita as the main character. Most of the Prietita stories remain unpublished, as do many stories about childhood or written for children. She wrote for stories for Mexican-American children to challenge the feelings of inferiority they learned in school as a project of "decolonizing, disindoctrinating ourselves from the oppressive messages we have been given".

Poems 
Anzaldúa included poems in her other writing, including her book Borderlands / La Frontera. Scholar Ariana Vigil characterizes the poetry of Anzaldúa as a site of "necessary social critique", drawing upon her experiences that are "linked to a raced, working-class condition and subject".

Notes and references

Notes

Citations

Works cited